The Diamond Games (due to sponsorship known for the last time as BNP Paribas Fortis Diamond Games and before that Proximus Diamond Games, GDF-Suez Diamond Games and Thomas Cook Diamond Games) was a professional women's tennis tournament organised in Antwerp, Belgium. The tournament took place in the Sportpaleis, at the beginning of February.

In 2009, with the restructuring of the WTA Tour and the retirement of both Kim Clijsters and Justine Henin, the tournament lost its status of being a WTA Tour tournament and evolved into an annual exhibition tennis event before returning to the WTA calendar in 2015. Later this year, however, WTA announced that in 2016, the Diamond Games would be replaced on the WTA calendar with a new tournament in St. Petersburg, Russia.

The Diamond Games offers a trophy to any player who wins the singles three times in five years. In 2007, Amélie Mauresmo won a golden racquet decorated with diamonds. A new trophy was unveiled in 2008, which featured a golden racquet and a ball, and was decorated with 2008 diamonds.

Past finals

Singles

Doubles

See also
 Belgian Open – women's tournament (1987–2002)
 Brussels Open – women's tournament (2011–2013)

References

External links 

 

 
Tennis tournaments in Belgium
Hard court tennis tournaments
Indoor tennis tournaments
WTA Tour
Sports competitions in Antwerp
Recurring sporting events established in 2002
2002 establishments in Belgium
Recurring sporting events disestablished in 2015
2015 disestablishments in Belgium